Nógrádszakál is a village and commune in Nógrád County, Hungary with 636 inhabitants (2015).

Populated places in Nógrád County